1988 saw many sequels and prequels in video games, such as Dragon Quest III, Super Contra, Super Mario Bros. 2, Mega Man 2, Double Dragon II: The Revenge, and Super Mario Bros. 3, along with new titles such as Assault, Altered Beast, Capcom Bowling, Ninja Gaiden, RoboCop, Winning Run and Chase H.Q.

The year's highest-grossing arcade games were After Burner and After Burner II in Japan, Double Dragon in the United States, Operation Wolf in the United Kingdom, and RoboCop in Hong Kong. The year's bestselling home system was the Nintendo Entertainment System (Famicom) for the fifth year in a row, while the year's best-selling home video games were Dragon Quest III in Japan and Super Mario Bros./Duck Hunt in the United States.

Events
 Out Run wins Game of the Year at the 5th Golden Joystick Awards, for the year 1987.
June – Nintendo releases the last issue (#7) of Nintendo Fun Club News.
July – Nintendo releases the first issue of Nintendo Power magazine.
December - Namco releases their first 3D polygon video game, Winning Run, running on the Namco System 21 arcade board.

Financial performance

Highest-grossing arcade games

Japan
In Japan, the following titles were the highest-grossing arcade games of 1988, according to the annual Gamest and Game Machine charts.

Hong Kong and United States
In Hong Kong and the United States, the following titles were the highest-grossing arcade games of 1988.

United Kingdom
Operation Wolf was the top-earning arcade game of 1988 in the United Kingdom. The following titles were the top-grossing games on the monthly arcade charts in 1988.

Best-selling home systems

Best-selling home video games

Japan
The following titles were the top ten best-selling home video games of 1988 in Japan, according to the annual Family Computer Magazine (Famimaga) charts.

United Kingdom and United States
In the United States, the NES Action Set bundled with Super Mario Bros./Duck Hunt was the best-selling toy of 1988. The same year, Super Mario Bros. 2 became one of the best-selling cartridges of all time, Super Mario Bros. 2 and Zelda II: The Adventure of Link were the top-selling cartridges during the holiday season, and The Legend of Zelda and Mike Tyson's Punch-Out each crossed  sales between 1987 and 1988.

The following titles were the top-selling home video games of each month in the United Kingdom and United States during 1988.

Top-rated games

Major awards

Japan

United Kingdom

United States

Famitsu Platinum Hall of Fame
The following 1988 video game releases entered Famitsu magazine's "Platinum Hall of Fame" for receiving Famitsu scores of at least 35 out of 40.

Business
New companies: Eurocom, Image Works, Koeo, Stormfront,  Visual Concepts, Walt Disney Computer Software
Defunct: Aackosoft, Coleco, Sente, Spectravideo
Activision renamed to Mediagenic
Nintendo vs. Camerica lawsuit: Nintendo sues Camerica over the clone production of an Advantage joystick controller for the NES console

Notable releases

Arcade
April – Namco releases Assault, which may be the first game to use hardware rotation of sprites and the background.
 August – Sega releases Altered Beast, later ported to the Mega Drive/Genesis where it was packaged with the console in North America and Europe.
 December – Capcom releases  Ghouls 'n Ghosts, the sequel to Ghosts 'n Goblins.
 December – Namco releases Winning Run, the first polygonal 3D arcade racing game.
 December – Technōs Japan releases Double Dragon II: The Revenge, the first sequel to Double Dragon, released during the previous year.
Atari Games releases an official arcade version of Tetris as well as Cyberball and Toobin'.
Namco releases World Stadium, Berabow Man, Marchen Maze, Bakutotsu Kijuutei, which is the sequel to Baraduke, Ordyne, Metal Hawk, World Court, Splatterhouse, which is the first game to get a parental advisory disclaimer, Mirai Ninja, Face Off and Phelios.
Williams releases the violent, drug-themed NARC, beginning a run of major hits for the company.

Home
January 2 – Electronic Arts releases Wasteland.
January 5 – shareware game The Adventures of Captain Comic is one of the first NES-style scrolling platform games for MS-DOS, setting the stage for a subsequent shareware boom.
January 8 – Konami releases Super Contra.
January 14 – Konami releases Konami Wai Wai World the first ever crossover game features cast of all star characters from various video game franchises & non-video game properties such as characters from blockbuster movies.
January 29 – the first commercial versions of Tetris are released.
February 10 – Enix releases Dragon Quest III.
March – R.C. Pro-Am is released and becomes a hit for the NES, drawing attention to UK developer Rare.
July 20 – Capcom releases Bionic Commando, for NES/Famicom based on the 1987 arcade game of the same title.
August – Treasure Island Dizzy is released by Codemasters.
 October 5 – Origin Systems releases Ultima V: Warriors of Destiny, which includes a time-of-day system and daily schedules for non-player characters.
October 9 – Nintendo revamps Doki Doki Panic and releases it as Super Mario Bros. 2,  for the Nintendo Entertainment System in America and the PAL region. Birdo made her debut in this game and released in Japan as Super Mario USA in 1992.
October 23 – Nintendo releases Super Mario Bros. 3 for the Famicom in Japan. First appearance of the Koopalings.
 December 1 – Nintendo releases Zelda II: The Adventure of Link in America.  The game had been released nearly two years earlier in Japan on the Famicom Disk System, before America even saw the first The Legend of Zelda.
 December 9 – Tecmo releases Ninja Gaiden for the NES/Famicom.
 December 17 – Square Co. releases Final Fantasy II for the Famicom Disk System as the second installment of the Final Fantasy series.
 December 24 – Capcom releases Mega Man 2 in Japan, eventually becoming the highest-selling installment of the entire Mega Man franchise with a total of 1.5 million copies sold.
Pool of Radiance the first of the SSI Gold Box games is released, the first computer RPG officially based on Advanced Dungeons & Dragons.
Superior Software release Exile on the Acorn Electron and BBC Micro. A complex arcade adventure, it is the first with a full physics engine.
Sega releases Phantasy Star outside Japan for the Sega Master System, the first in the company's most successful series of role-playing video games.
Electronic Arts releases John Madden Football for the Apple II, starting its highly successful line of American football games.
Interplay's animated chess program Battle Chess is released for the Amiga, then widely ported.
Pioneer Plague makes use of the Amiga's 4096 color Hold-And-Modify mode, something not thought possible for animated games.
AMC Verlag releases Herbert for the Atari 8-bit family.

Hardware
October 29 – Sega Mega Drive released in Japan.
Nintendo buys the rights to Bandai's Family Trainer and re-releases it as the Power Pad.
Namco releases the Namco System 21, the first arcade system board specifically designed for 3D polygon graphics.

See also
1988 in games

References

 
 
Video games by year
video games